Jaimie D. McEvoy (born August 14, 1965) is an author, historian, politician, and community activist in New Westminster, British Columbia.

McEvoy was elected to the New Westminster City Council in 2008, and re-elected in 2011, 2014, and 2018.  He is the Chair of several city committees. He is also the city's representative to the Fraser Health Municipal Advisory Committee.  His campaign website is www.jaimiemcevoy.ca

Jaimie became an author the same year he was elected for the first time, in 2008. His book titled The Life and Destruction of Saint Mary's Hospital marked the inception of his literary career. 

He was the proponent of New Westminster's Living Wage policy, which was first municipal Living Wage policy adopted in Canada. 

He worked to preserve the Columbia Theatre (formerly known as the Burr Theatre) as a functional heritage building.

He is a member of New Westminster's Homelessness Coalition and previously served on the Museum Advisory Committee and the Parks and Recreation Commission. He is a past president of the Brow of the Hill Residents’ Association, the Twelfth Street Neighborhood Society, and a past director for the Royal City Humane Society and the New Westminster Heritage Preservation Society. He is the Director of the Hospitality Project at the New Westminster Food Bank.

McEvoy played a key role in the unsuccessful effort to prevent the closure of Saint Mary's Hospital in New Westminster in 2004. His aforementioned book elaborated about the history of the hospital and the public campaign to prevent the closure, The Life and Destruction of Saint Mary's Hospital (Harbour Publishing, 2008).

References

Living people
Canadian activists
People from New Westminster
1965 births